is the incumbent president of Japan Tobacco, a Nikkei 225 company.

He replaced Hiroshi Kimura as president in June 2012.

References 

1957 births
Living people
Japanese businesspeople
Japan Tobacco